Moorestown Friends School and Meetinghouse is a historic Quaker school and meetinghouse on Main Street at Chester Avenue in Moorestown Township, Burlington County, New Jersey, United States. The Friends Meeting hosts Quaker worship every Sunday in the meetinghouse, as well as a variety of events, including Christmas Eve meetings for worship and youth activities.

The meetinghouse was built in 1802 and added to the National Register of Historic Places in 1988.

See also
National Register of Historic Places listings in Burlington County, New Jersey

References

Quaker meeting houses in New Jersey
Churches on the National Register of Historic Places in New Jersey
School buildings on the National Register of Historic Places in New Jersey
Colonial Revival architecture in New Jersey
Churches completed in 1802
Churches in Burlington County, New Jersey
Moorestown, New Jersey
National Register of Historic Places in Burlington County, New Jersey
New Jersey Register of Historic Places